Dieterich is both a surname and a masculine German given name, a variant of Dietrich, itself the High German form of Theodoric. Notable people with the name include:

Surname:
 Albrecht Dieterich (1866–1908), German classical philologist and religious scholar
 Chris Dieterich (born 1958), American football player
 Heinz Dieterich (born 1943), German sociologist
 Johann Christian Dieterich (1722–1800), German publisher
 Neil Dieterich (born 1943), American lawyer and politician
 William H. Dieterich (1876–1940), US Senator and Congressman from Illinois
 William H. Dieterich (judge) (1897–1964), American lawyer and Wisconsin Supreme Court Justice

Given name:
 Dieterich Buxtehude, (1637/39–1707), German-Danish organist and composer
 Dieterich Spahn, German-born American artist

See also 
 Dieterich, Illinois, village in Effingham County, Illinois, United States
 Dietrich
 Dittrich

German masculine given names
German-language surnames